Knut Andreassen Holst   (3 December 1884 – 4 February 1977)   is a Norwegian Nordic skier who shared the Holmenkollen medal in 1911 with Otto Tangen.

References
Holmenkollen medalists - click Holmenkollmedaljen for downloadable pdf file 

Holmenkollen medalists
1884 births
1977 deaths